Beatrice Lanza (born 22 March 1982) is a triathlete. She was born in Biella, Italy. Lanza competed at the second Olympic triathlon at the 2004 Summer Olympics. She took fifteenth place with a total time of 2:07:59.26.

References

External links
 

Living people
1982 births
Italian female triathletes
Olympic triathletes of Italy
Triathletes at the 2004 Summer Olympics
Duathletes
21st-century Italian women